Teotónio Emanuel Ribeiro Vieira de Castro was a Roman Catholic prelate who served as the Archbishop of the Archdiocese of Goa e Damão, India and Patriarch of the East Indies from 1929 to 1940.

Early life 
Castro was born in Porto, Portugal on 27 July 1859.

Priesthood 
On 8 April 1882, Castro was ordained a catholic priest.

Episcopate 
Castro was appointed bishop of the Diocese of São Tomé of Meliapore and consecrated as a bishop by Bishop António José de Souza Barroso on 15 August 1899, in Porto.

On 25 May 1929, he was appointed Archbishop and Patriarch of East Indies of Goa e Damão, India.

Death 
Castro died on 16 May 1940.

References 

1859 births
People from Porto
1940 deaths
Portuguese Roman Catholic priests
20th-century Roman Catholic archbishops in India
Portuguese people of colonial India
Patriarchs of the East Indies